Anu Vardhan is an Indian costume designer and entrepreneur.

Career 
A graduate of visual communications from Loyola College, Chennai is a recipient of State Award for Best Costume Design and number of other awards. Anu Vardhan's first involvement in the film industry was through her family friend Santosh Sivan's The Terrorist (1997). She worked on costume designing, scripting dialogues, and also appeared in  the film as a friend of the film's lead character played by Ayesha Dharker. She then worked with Sivan again in Asoka (2001), as the Principal Costume designer. After extensive research on the historical period, Vardhan helped prepare 3rd century period costumes for the lead actors Shahrukh Khan and Kareena Kapoor. Vardhan has worked extensively with actor Ajith Kumar, collaborating with him on his projects with Vishnuvardhan and Siva.

In 2016, Vardhan worked on Kabali (2016),  she styled Rajinikanth in two different looks - as a gangster wearing high-end suits and as a labourer in the 1980s.
This film won her much appreciation and won her numerous awards The success of the film prompted director Pa. Ranjith to sign her for his next film with Rajinikanth, Kaala (2018). In the film, Anu was tasked to primarily dress the actor in kurtas and lungis, with a black theme.

Anu has also regularly used handloom products in her work, notably designing silk-cotton saris for Nayanthara for her role in Viswasam (2019). The popularity of the style prompted a demand for a similar products. She continued to design costumes with similar materials for Nayanthara in Bigil (2019) and Darbar (2020).

Personal life 
Anu Vardhan is the granddaughter of Veteran Tamil actor N. S. Krishnan. Her husband Vishnuvardhan is a film director. The pair had met at Loyola College and had also worked on Santosh Sivan's The Terrorist (1997) together.

Notable filmography

As actress

As costume designer 

The Terrorist (1997)
Asoka (2001)
Navarasa (2005)
Billa (2007)
Sarvam (2009)
Panjaa (2011)
Sri Rama Rajyam (2011)
Arrambam (2013)
Veeram (2014)
Vedalam (2015)
Kabali (2016)
Kaashmora (2016)
Vivegam (2017)
Kaala (2018)
Viswasam (2019)
Bigil (2019)
Darbar (2020)
Pattas (2020)
Valimai (2022)
Thunivu (2023)

As producer

References

External links 

Living people
Indian fashion designers
Indian costume designers
Artists from Tamil Nadu
21st-century Indian designers
Year of birth missing (living people)
Indian women fashion designers
Fashion stylists